Takashi Tojo is a Japanese mixed martial artist.

Mixed martial arts record

|-
| Draw
| align=center| 0-2-3
| Tomonori Ohara
| Draw
| Shooto - Shooto
| 
| align=center| 4
| align=center| 3:00
| Tokyo, Japan
| 
|-
| Loss
| align=center| 0-2-2
| Yasuto Sekishima
| Submission (armbar)
| Shooto - Shooto
| 
| align=center| 2
| align=center| 0:00
| Tokyo, Japan
| 
|-
| Draw
| align=center| 0-1-2
| Satoshi Honma
| Submission (armbar)
| Shooto - Shooto
| 
| align=center| 1
| align=center| 0:00
| Tokyo, Japan
| 
|-
| Loss
| align=center| 0-1-1
| Yuji Ito
| Submission (kimura)
| Shooto - Shooto
| 
| align=center| 3
| align=center| 0:00
| Tokyo, Japan
| 
|-
| Draw
| align=center| 0-0-1
| Manabu Yamada
| Draw
| Shooto - Shooto
| 
| align=center| 3
| align=center| 3:00
| Tokyo, Japan
|

See also
List of male mixed martial artists

References

External links
 
 Takashi Tojo at mixedmartialarts.com

Japanese male mixed martial artists
Living people
Year of birth missing (living people)